Pastanjauhantaa is a popular Finnish food blog and formerly a popular blog in Finland.

See also
 Pastanjauhantaa

References 

Websites about food and drink
Finnish websites